WXGN-LP (92.7 FM, "92.7 The Voice") is a radio station broadcasting a Christian radio format. Licensed to serve Ocean City, New Jersey, United States, the station is currently owned by Joy Broadcasting, Inc.

References

External links
 
 

XGN-LP
XGN-LP
Radio stations established in 2004
2004 establishments in New Jersey